Osama Hawsawi (born 31 March 1984) is a retired Saudi Arabian footballer who played as a central defender.

After starting out at Al-Wehda, he went on to spend the vast majority of his career with Al-Hilal and Al-Ahli. He won several major titles with both clubs, including five Pro League titles, five Crown Prince Cups and two King Cups. In addition, he became the first Saudi player to play in the Belgian Pro League.

Hawsawi earned 138 caps for the Saudi Arabia national team between 2006 and 2018, playing at three AFC Asian Cups, captaining the side at the 2018 World Cup and finishing as runner-up at the 2007 AFC Asian Cup.

Club career

Al Wehda
Hawsawi began his professional football career where Al-Wehda Club and soon after, at Al-Wehda, he became a regular in the first team, playing in the central defense.

Al Hilal
After making 59 appearances and scoring once, Hawsawi joined Al-Hilal. While at Al-Hilal, Hawsawi was a regular player under the manager of Eric Gerets, Hawsawi was appointed the captain. Hawsawi won seven titles with Al-Hilal. Three league titles (in 2008, 2010 and 2011 seasons) and 4 Crown Prince Cup.

Anderlecht
In April 2012, Hawsawi signed a two-year contract with Belgian side Anderlecht, making him the only member of the Saudi Arabia national team to play in Europe at the time. Hawsawi was the first Saudi Arabian to play for the club and in the league. He described his time at Anderlecht as 'forgettable' due to lack of playing time at the club and only made one appearance for the club when played as a centre back in a 1–1 draw against OH Leuven on 25 August 2012. Hawsawi was also on the substitute bench when Anderlecht won the Belgian Super Cup but he wasn't substituted.

Al-Ahli
In November 2012, Hawsawi finally left Belgium to return to his homeland by joining Al-Ahli for 1.5 million.

Al-Hilal
In 2016, Al-Hilal made Hawsawi return to Al-Hilal for 5.5 million dollars (21 million riyals). In his first season he won the Saudi King's Cup & the Saudi Professional League. In his second season with Al-Hilal, he helped the club win a second consecutive league title and reach the finals of the 2017 AFC Champions League.

Al-Wehda return
On August 23, 2018, Osama Hawsawi signed for his boyhood club Al-Wehda for free following the expiration of his contract.

Retirement
On December 26, 2018, Osama Hawsawi announced his retirement from football on his personal twitter account.

International career
He is captain in the Saudi Arabia team. He appeared for his country for the 2007 Gulf Cup of Nations and was a member of the Saudi team at the FIFA World Youth Championship. He was called-up in the squad for the 2007 AFC Asian Cup.

On 29 May 2010, he scored an excellent goal against Spain, after a corner kick which put the Saudi Arabian team ahead 1-0 against Spain, scoring his second goal against the Saudi Arabia national team.

In June 2018 he was included in the Saudi Arabia national football team for the 2018 FIFA World Cup in Russia, captaining his side in all three matches at the finals.

Career statistics
Updated 26 December 2018

Club

International
Statistics accurate as of match played 25 June 2018.

International goals

Honours

Club

Al-Hilal
Pro League: 2009–10, 2010–11, 2016–17, 2017–18
King Cup: 2017
Crown Prince Cup: 2008–09, 2009–10, 2010–11, 2011–12

Al-Ahli
Pro League: 2015–16
King Cup: 2016
Crown Prince Cup: 2014–15

See also
 List of men's footballers with 100 or more international caps

References

External links

1984 births
Living people
Sportspeople from Mecca
Association football central defenders
Saudi Arabian footballers
Saudi Arabia international footballers
2007 AFC Asian Cup players
2011 AFC Asian Cup players
2015 AFC Asian Cup players
Al-Wehda Club (Mecca) players
Al Hilal SFC players
R.S.C. Anderlecht players
Al-Ahli Saudi FC players
Belgian Pro League players
Expatriate footballers in Belgium
Saudi Arabian expatriate sportspeople in Belgium
Saudi Arabian expatriate footballers
FIFA Century Club
Hausa people
Saudi Arabian people of Nigerian descent
Saudi Professional League players
2018 FIFA World Cup players